Anton Sergeyevich Sintsov (born 3 February 1985) is a Russian road and mountain bike racer. He rode at the cross-country event at the 2016 Summer Olympics. He was on the start list for the 2018 Cross-country European Championship and he finished 7th. At the 2020 Summer Olympics in mountain bike cross-country Sintsov finished 11th, the best result of a Russian in that event.

Major results
2008
 1st Gara Ciclistica Milionaria
 2nd Giro Ciclisto del Cigno
2010
 3rd Gara Ciclistica Montappone
2014
 1st  Cross-country, National Mountain Bike Championships
2017
 1st  Cross-country, National Mountain Bike Championships

References

1985 births
Living people
Russian male cyclists
Cyclists at the 2016 Summer Olympics
Olympic cyclists of Russia
Sportspeople from Izhevsk
Cyclists at the 2020 Summer Olympics